Lucie Johnson Scruggs (née Lucie Johnson; October 14, 1864 - November 24, 1892) was born into slavery and she became an educator and writer from the U.S. state of Virginia. She was married to a biographer of noted women and he included her in his book.

Early years and education
Lucie Johnson was the youngest of four children, and was born a slave in Richmond, Virginia, October 14, 1864. She was partly of Native American heritage. Until she was nine years old, she knew few people apart from her mother's slaveowner's grandchildren.

She entered the city's public schools in 1873 aged nine years. Her sister was then in the fourth grammar grade. Scruggs was promoted twice every session, showing an unusual talent for mathematics. When she was fourteen she joined the First Baptist Church of Richmond. She was kept out of school for two winters by illness attributed to "rapid growth" and they decided to try a change of climate. She left Richmond recommended for Shaw University at Raleigh, North Carolina. She graduated in May, 1883, and she went to New York City to join her mother.

Career
In October 1883, shortly after the death of her only brother, she went to Chatham, Virginia, to teach. In May 1884, she returned to New York, and she and her sister opened a private school for girls. They managed it for four years and she wrote articles for the Richmond Planet and similar journals. In 1886, she published a grammar designed for beginners, entitled Grammar-Land.

Lucie Johnson met Lawson Andrew Scruggs at Shaw University and they married on February 22, 1888. They were married at St. Mark's Methodist Episcopal Church, New York by Rev. Henry Lyman Morehouse. Soon after, she wrote a drama, Farmer Fox. She and her husband moved to Raleigh where she joined the Blount Street Baptist Church. Scruggs was a member of the Second Baptist Church and the King's Daughters' Missionary Society. She organized and was twice elected president of the Pansy Literary Society.

Scruggs had two children, Leonard and Goldie. She died November 24, 1892, after a brief illness. The following year Lawson Scruggs published a book titled "Women of Distinction" and he included his late wife.

References

Attribution

Bibliography

1892 deaths
1864 births
19th-century American women writers
19th-century American writers
Writers from Richmond, Virginia
19th-century American educators
Founders of schools in the United States
19th-century American slaves
19th-century American women educators
19th-century philanthropists
19th-century African-American women